Sahūr, Suhūr, or Suhoor, also called Sahari, Sahrī, or Sehri (Persian/Urdu: سحری, Bangla: সেহরী) is the meal consumed early in the morning by Muslims before fasting (sawm), before dawn during or outside the Islamic month of Ramadan. The meal is eaten before fajr prayer. Sahur corresponds to iftar- the evening meal during Ramadan, replacing the traditional three meals a day (breakfast, lunch, and dinner), although in some places dinner is also consumed after iftar later during the night.

Being the last meal eaten by Muslims before fasting from dawn to sunset during the month of Ramadan, suhur is regarded by Islamic traditions as a benefit of the blessings in that it allows the person fasting to avoid the crankiness or the weakness caused by the fast. According to a hadith in Sahih al-Bukhari, Anas ibn Malik narrated, "The Prophet said, 'take suhur as there is a blessing in it.'"

Musaharati
The musaharati is a public waker for suhur and dawn prayer during Ramadan. According to the history books, Bilal ibn Rabah was the first musaharati in Islamic history, as he used to roam the streets and roads throughout the night to wake people up.

The occupation is described by a Damascus musaharati: "My duty during the holy month of Ramadhan is to wake people up in the old city of Damascus for prayers and Suhur meal." According to a Sidon musaharati, the attributes every musaharati should possess are physical fitness and good health, "because he is required to walk long distances every day. He should also have a loud voice and good lungs, as well as an ability to read poems. A musaharati should supplicate God throughout the night to wake the sleepers."

The tradition is practiced in Egypt, Syria, Sudan, Saudi Arabia, Jordan, India, Pakistan, Bangladesh, and Palestine. However, there has been a gradual disappearance of the musaharati due to several factors, including: Muslims staying up later; using technology such as alarm clocks to wake for suhur; and louder and larger homes and cities that make the voice of the musaharati harder to hear. However, the old Dhakaiya tradition of singing qasidas can still be found in the streets of Old Dhaka in Bangladesh.

In Indonesia, a kentongan is used to wake households up to eat the suhur meal.

References

External links
 Laylatul Qadr: The Night of Power in Islam 

Breakfast
Fasting in Islam
Ramadan
Religious food and drink
Islamic terminology